KF Bylis, also known as Bylis Ballsh, is an Albanian football club based in Ballsh, Mallakastër District. The club's home ground is the Adush Muça Stadium and they currently compete in the Kategoria Superiore.

History

Early history
The club was formed in September 1972 as Ballshi i Ri, and they played in the Albanian Third Division between 1973 and 1976. But between 1976 and 1981, they were not allowed to participate in Albanian football due to laws restricting a single team from each district. They began playing once again in the Third Division in 1981, which they eventually won in 1986 and were promoted to the Albanian Second Division. The club played in the Second Division for 10 years between 1986 and 1996, where they were promoted following a successful 1995–96 season which saw the club score 124 goals and concede just 21, making it a national record which was even noted by prestigious French magazine France Football. However, despite their record breaking season they finished as runners-up in the league but still achieved promotion to the Albanian Superliga.

Golden days
In their debut season in the top flight of Albanian football the club finished in 14th place out of 18 teams. During the 1998–99 season, the club finished in third place, just 2 points behind the eventual champions KF Tirana this earned the club a place in the UEFA Cup for the first time. In their first European experience KF Bylis played Slovakian side Inter Bratislava, whom they lost 5–1 to on aggregate. The following season they would again finish strongly, this time in 5th place, joint on points with 4th place side Vllaznia Shkodër, who they lost 4–3 to in the play-off for the UEFA Intertoto Cup place. In the 2000–01 season, they finished 5th once again and earned a place in the UEFA Intertoto Cup, where they met Romanian side FC Universitatea Craiova the following season. They lost 4–3 on aggregate, after a memorable 3–3 draw away in Romania and a 1–0 home loss.

Recent history
KF Bylis then began to struggle, eventually getting relegated after a poor 2002–03 season which saw they finish second to last with just 26 points and 3 wins from 26 games. They were relegated once again to the third tier after the 2004–05 season in which they scored just 13 league goals in total. Between 2007 and 2009 the club achieved back-to-back promotions back to the Albanian Superliga for the 2008–09 season.

Besnik Kapllanaj was the club's president between 2006 and 2014 and owned a  75% share in the club, with the remaining 25% owned by the Ballsh Municipality.

On 15 March 2014 in a home tie against KF Laçi, the club's president was involved in an altercation with the FSHS head of competitions, Besnik Çela. Kapllanaj hit the FSHF delegate Çela in the head with a baton which required him to be rushed to hospital due to the injury. Cela refused to start the game due to overcrowding inside the Adush Muça Stadium. Once some of the fans had left they began to throw rock into the stadium in disapproval of the FSHF's decision to not let them watch the match, which kicked off 20 minutes later than scheduled. Kapllanaj then allegedly caused a power cut so that SuperSport Albania cameras could not transmit the game live as was planned. In the closing stages of the game KF Laçi were awarded a penalty which caused crowd trouble, as they began to throw rocks onto the pitch. KF Laçi's president Pashk Laska instructed captain and penalty taker Erjon Vuçaj to miss the penalty intentionally to avoid further trouble and danger for his teammates. Following the final whistle, Kapllanaj physically abused KF Laçi's players by hitting them with a baton, as well as Besnik Çela, who later filed a police report against Kapllanaj once he left the hospital. On 19 March, the club's president Besnik Kapllanaj resigned from his post hours before the verdict from the FSHF disciplinary commission, who punished him with a lifetime ban from sporting activities in Albania. The commission also expelled the club from the Albanian Superliga with 9 remaining games of the 2013–14 season, relegating the club to the Albanian First Division for the 2014–15 season as well as handing KF Laçi a 3–0 victory in the game which originally ended 0–0. The following day, Kapllanaj turned himself in to the Fier police authorities after being charged for assault.

Recent seasons

KF Bylis in Europe
As of December, 2008.

 QR = Qualifying Round
 1R = 1st Round

Players

Current squad

Out on loan

Notable players
Had international caps for their respective countries. Players whose name is listed in bold represented their countries while playing for Bylis Ballsh.
''Past (and present) players who are the subjects of Wikipedia articles can be found

 Agim Metaj	
 Julian Ahmataj
 Klodian Asllani
 Engert Bakalli
 Endri Bakiu
 Ferdinand Bilali
 Edmond Dalipi
 Klevis Dalipi
 Bledar Devolli
 Ilir Dibra
 Amarildo Dimo
 Johan Driza
 Anesti Vito 
 Dashnor Dume
 Stivi Frashëri
 Alpin Gallo
 Romeo Haxhiaj
 Isli Hidi
 Akil Jakupi
 Maringlen Kule
 Gentian Muça
 Olgert Muka
 Oltion Osmani
 Artion Poçi
 Jetmir Sefa
 Gentian Stojku
 Daniel Xhafa
 Fjodor Xhafa  
 Ardit Hoxhaj  
 Guy Madjo
 Borjan Pancevski
 Dimitar Kapinkovski
 Kire Ristevski
 Mirza Durakovic
 Miloš Stojanović
 Patrik Bordon
 Marco Morgon
 João Ananias
 Rafael Barbosa
 Birungueta
 Alan Henrique
 Ndubuisi Egbo
 January Ziambo
 Peter Olayinka
 James Adeniyi 
 Solomonson Izuchukwuka
 Kehinde Owoeye
 Odirah Ntephe
 Beji Anthony
 Saliou Guindo

Historical list of managers

 Migjen Skënderi (1995-1998)
 Vangjel Capo (1998)
 Hysen Dedja (1999)
 Shpëtim Duro (1999-2000)
 Vasil Bici (2000)
 Vangjel Capo (2001)
 Petraq Bisha (2001)
 Ilir Gjyla (2002)
 Andrea Marko (21 Sep 2002 - 7 Dec 2002)
 Migjen Skënderi (2003)
 Kristaq Mile (2003-2004)
 Faruk Sejdini (Jul 2007 – 15 Sep 2008)
 Hysen Dedja (15 Sep 2008 – 4 May 2009)
 Gerd Haxhiu (4 May 2009 - Jun 2009)
 Ilir Spahiu (Jul 2009 - 13 Sep 2010)
 Agim Metaj (2010)
 Nikola Ilievski (13 Sep 2010 - 7 Mar 2011)
 Agim Canaj (7 Mar 2011 - Jun 2011)
 Naci Şensoy (Jul 2011 - Jun 2012)
 Agim Canaj (Jul 2012 - 20 Nov 2012)
 Naci Şensoy (20 Nov 2012 - Jun 2013)
 Ndubuisi Egbo (1 Aug 2013 – 30 May 2014)
 Roland Nenaj (1 Jul 2014 - 31 May 2015)
 Agim Canaj (28 Jul 2015 - 8 Oct 2015)
 Mauro De Vecchis (08 Oct 2015 - 23 Oct 2015)
 Marenglen Kule (23 Oct 2015 - 29 Jan 2016)
 Adnan Zildžović (29 Jan 2016 - Jul 2016)
 Julian Ahmataj (Sep 2016 - Oct 2016)
 Eqerem Memushi (14 Oct 2016 - 26 Jan 2017)
 Artan Mërgjyshi (Jan 2017 - Apr 2017)
 Marcello Troisi (Apr 2017 – May 2017)
 Bledar Devolli (5 Aug 2017 - 4 Oct 2017)
 Stavri Nica (Oct 2017 - Nov 2017)
 Marcello Troisi (Jan 2018 – Feb 2018)
 Veljko Dovedan (1 July 2018 – 6 June 2021)
 Jeton Beqiri (7 June 2021 – 15 Aug 2022 )
 Arjan Bellaj (16 Aug 2022 - 22 Jan 2023)
 Naci Şensoy (23 Jan 2023 - )

References

KF Bylis Ballsh
Football clubs in Albania
Association football clubs established in 1972
Mallakastër
1972 establishments in Albania
Albanian Third Division clubs
Kategoria e Dytë clubs